Vilho Oskari Tilkanen (14 April 1885 – 1 August 1945) was a Finnish road racing cyclist who competed in the 1912 Summer Olympics. He was born and died in Karinainen.

In 1912 he was a member of the Finnish cycling team which finished fifth in the team time trial event. In the individual time trial competition he finished 21st.

References

1885 births
1945 deaths
People from Pöytyä
Finnish male cyclists
Olympic cyclists of Finland
Cyclists at the 1912 Summer Olympics
Sportspeople from Southwest Finland